Stara Moravica (or) is a village located in the Bačka Topola municipality, in the North Bačka District of Serbia. It is situated in the Autonomous Province of Vojvodina. The village has a Hungarian ethnic majority and its population numbering 5,699 people (2002 census).

Etymology 

Its name has changed many times throughout history: or 20 versions can be listed. The story begins with the settlements of the Avar period: Okor, Omar, then Omarica, Omaricsa, Omorovics, Omarocsa. The name Omorovica appeared in Turkish times. Similar versions were included until the turn of the century: Omorovicza, Bács-Omorovicza, Ómorovicza. From 1907 Kossuthfalva and from 1912 Bácskossuthfalva was the official name of the village.

History 
Between 1782 and 1786, Hungarians settled in Stara Moravica.

Geography 

It is situated halfway between Belgrade and Budapest in a geographical region of Bačka.

Map coordinates: .

Climate

Demographics 

Stara Moravica had a population of 5,699 in 2002. The village has been declining in population since the 1960s. In 1991, there were 6,266 people, 5,576 Hungarians, 278 Serbs, and 412 persons of other ethnicities. However, by 2002, the population had decreased to 5,699, with 4,975 Hungarians, 505 Serbs, and 219 persons of other ethnicities.

Religion 

Stara Moravica has two churches: one Catholic and one Calvinist Protestant.

Culture 
The village celebrates several festivals throughout the year: the annual Village Fair in May, the Beer Festival in August, the Grape Picking Festival in September, the Fall Harvest Festival in October, the Honey Festival in November, and the Village Celebration in December.

There is an artist colony in Stara Moravica that attracts artists from all over the world for a few weeks. In addition, the village has one of the largest art collections in the Vojvodina province and has a Cultural House.

In popular culture 
Stara Moravica was featured on the HGTV series House Hunters International Renovation.

See also 
 List of places in Serbia
 List of cities, towns and villages in Vojvodina

References 

 Slobodan Ćurčić, Broj stanovnika Vojvodine, Novi Sad, 1996.

External links 

 Lancember.net - The Page for Fans of Stara Moravica
 History of Stara Moravica 

Places in Bačka
Populated places in North Bačka District
Hungarian communities in Serbia